Joel Thomas may refer to:
Joel Thomas (swimmer) (born 1966), American Olympic swimmer in the 1992 Games
Joël Thomas (born 1987), French footballer
Joel Thomas (artist), American fantasy artist
Joel Thomas (American football), American football coach